Brusnik is an uninhabited volcanic island in the Croatian part of the Adriatic Sea.  The island is part of the Dalmatian archipelago.

Name
The island's name comes from the word brus ("whetstone"), because volcanic rocks from the island were used for making whetstones.

Location

The island is located 12 NM west of Komiža, town on island of Vis, and 2 NM south-west from the island of Svetac (Sv. Andrija). 

The area of the island is 3 ha. Brusnik is 320 m long, 205 m wide, and has 30 meter high cliffs. The east coast is steep and difficult to reach, while the west coast is glacis toward the sea.

Flora and fauna
In 1951, the island was declared a geological monument of nature.
On the island, there is the endemic species of black lizard (Podarcis melisellensis melisellensis). The surrounding sea is rich with fish, especially blue fish.

See also
Croatia
Vis (island)
Dalmatia

References

Bibliography

External links
http://www.nika-adventure-tours.com/hr/brusnik-svetac.php
http://www.adriatica.net/croatia/feature/brusnikijabuka_hr.htm 

Islets of Croatia
Islands of the Adriatic Sea
Uninhabited islands of Croatia
Landforms of Split-Dalmatia County
Volcanic islands